Amaroo may refer to:

 In Australia:
 Amaroo, Australian Capital Territory
 Amaroo, New South Wales
 Amaroo, Queensland